Samarang is a 1933 American Pre-Code action film directed by Ward Wing and written by Thomas J. Geraghty. The film was released on June 28, 1933, by United Artists.

Plot

Cast
Ahmang as The Pearl Diver
Sai-Yu as Sweetheart
Chang-Fu as Captain
Mamounah as Mother
Ko-Hal as Brother

See also
Nudity in film

References

External links

Still at granger.com
Of lost kampongs, fishnet bondage and remnant tombs in an equatorial Hollywood: Location Scouting in Samarang
Lobby card and stills

1933 films
American black-and-white films
United Artists films
1930s action films
Films set in Indonesia
Films produced by B. F. Zeidman
American action films
1930s English-language films
1930s American films